Whitney Lyon Balliett (17 April 1926 – 1 February 2007) was a jazz critic and book reviewer for The New Yorker and was with the journal from 1954 until 2001.

Biography
Born in Manhattan and raised in Glen Cove, Long Island, Balliett attended Phillips Exeter Academy, where he learned to play drums in a band he summed up as "baggy Dixieland"; he played summer gigs at a Center Island yacht club.

He was drafted into the Army in 1946, interrupting his freshman year at Cornell University, to which he returned to finish his degree in 1951 and where he was a member of Delta Phi fraternity. He then took a job at The New Yorker, where he was hired by Katherine White, one of the magazine's fiction editors. He went on to write more than 550 signed pieces for The New Yorker, as well as many anonymous pieces.

Acclaimed for his literary writing style, Balliett died on 1 February 2007, aged 80, from cancer, survived by his second wife Nancy Balliett and five children (of both marriages): James Fargo Balliett, Blue Balliett, Will Balliett, Julie Lyon Rose, and Whitney Balliett, Jr.

Bibliography

Books 
 
Dinosaurs in the Morning: 41 Pieces on Jazz, 1962
Such Sweet Thunder: 49 Pieces on Jazz, 1966, Bobbs-Merrill Company
Super-drummer: A Profile of Buddy Rich, 1968
Ecstasy at the Onion: 31 Pieces on Jazz, 1971
Alec Wilder and His Friends, 1974, Houghton Mifflin 
New York Notes: A Journal of Jazz, 1972-1975, 1976, Houghton Mifflin
Improvising: Sixteen Jazz Musicians and Their Art, 1977, Oxford University Press
American Singers , 1979, Oxford University PressNight Creature: A Journal of Jazz 1975-1980, 1981, Oxford University PressJelly Roll, Jabbo, and Fats: 19 Portraits in Jazz, 1983, Oxford University PressAmerican Musicians: Fifty-Six Portraits in Jazz, 1986, Oxford University PressAmerican Singers: Twenty-seven Portraits in Song, 1988, Oxford University PressBarney, Bradley, and Max: Sixteen Portraits in Jazz, 1989, Oxford University PressGoodbyes and Other Messages: A Journal of Jazz, 1981-1990, 1991, Oxford University PressAmerican Musicians II: Seventy-one Portraits in Jazz, 1996, Oxford University PressCollected Works: A Journal of Jazz 1954-2000, 2000, St. Martin's PressNew York Voices: Fourteen Portraits, 2006, University Press of Mississippi

 Essays and reporting 
 "John Gordon's Folk Art: A Great Flowering of Free Spirits", The New Yorker, February 3, 1973 
 "Coming Out Again" (on Anita Ellis), The New Yorker'', July 31, 1978

Book reviews

Balliett's life and work

Notes

External links

Guardian obituary, 7 February 2007
Whitney Balliett's contributions to The New Yorker

1926 births
2007 deaths
American music journalists
Phillips Exeter Academy alumni
Cornell University alumni
The New Yorker people
The New Yorker critics
Writers from Manhattan
Deaths from cancer in the United States
Writers from Glen Cove, New York
Jazz writers
Journalists from New York City
Military personnel from New York City